Mucilaginibacter angelicae is a Gram-negative, aerobic and short-rod-shaped bacterium from the genus of Mucilaginibacter which has been isolated from a freshwater creek in Taiwan.

References

Sphingobacteriia
Bacteria described in 2018